The American pavilion is a national pavilion of the Venice Biennale. It houses the United States' official representation during the Biennale.

Background 

The Venice Biennale is an international art biennial exhibition held in Venice, Italy. Often described as "the Olympics of the art world", the Biennale is a prestigious event for contemporary artists known for propelling career visibility. The festival has become a constellation of shows: a central exhibition curated by that year's artistic director, national pavilions hosted by individual nations, and independent exhibitions throughout Venice. The Biennale parent organization also hosts regular festivals in other arts: architecture, dance, film, music, and theater.

Outside of the central, international exhibition, individual nations produce their own shows, known as pavilions, as their national representation. Nations that own their pavilion buildings, such as the 30 housed on the Giardini, are responsible for their own upkeep and construction costs as well. Nations without dedicated buildings create pavilions in venues throughout the city.

Organization and building 

The American pavilion was the ninth to be built on the Giardini, but unlike other pavilions, which are built by governments, the American pavilion was privately owned. The three-room Palladian building was constructed in 1930, for the New York Grand Central Art Galleries. Ownership transferred to the Museum of Modern Art in 1954 and to the Guggenheim Foundation in 1986.

For the United States' national representation, a committee of experts select from proposals written by institutions. The Advisory Committee on International Exhibitions is assembled by the National Endowment for the Arts and Department of State. The months-long process involves an application nearly 100 pages in length and a final embargo before announcement.

History 

The United States Pavilion at the Venice Biennale was constructed in 1930 by the Grand Central Art Galleries, a nonprofit artists' cooperative established in 1922 by Walter Leighton Clark together with John Singer Sargent, Edmund Greacen, and others. As stated in the Galleries' 1934 catalog, the organization's goal was to "give a broader field to American art; to exhibit in a larger way to a more numerous audience, not in New York alone but throughout the country, thus displaying to the world the inherent value which our art undoubtedly possesses."

In 1930, Walter Leighton Clark and the Grand Central Art Galleries spearheaded the creation of the U.S. Pavilion at the Venice Biennale. The pavilion's architects were William Adams Delano, who also designed the Grand Central Art Galleries, and Chester Holmes Aldrich. The purchase of the land, design, and construction was paid for by the galleries and personally supervised by Clark. As he wrote in the 1934 catalog:

"Pursuing our purpose of putting American art prominently before the world, the directors a few years ago appropriated the sum of $25,000 for the erection of an exhibition building in Venice on the grounds of the International Biennial. Messrs. Delano and Aldrich generously donated the plans for this building which is constructed of Istrian marble and pink brick and more than holds its own with the twenty-five other buildings in the Park owned by the various European governments."

The pavilion, owned and operated by the galleries, opened on May 4, 1930. Approximately 90 paintings and 12 sculptures were selected by Clark for the opening exhibition. Artists featured included Max Boehm, Hector Caser, Lillian Westcott Hale, Edward Hopper, Abraham Poole, Julius Rolshoven, Joseph Pollet, Eugene Savage, Elmer Shofeld, Ofelia Keelan, and African-American artist Henry Tanner. U.S. Ambassador John W. Garrett opened the show together with the Duke of Bergamo.

The Grand Central Art Galleries operated the U.S. Pavilion until 1954, when it was sold to the Museum of Modern Art (MOMA). Throughout the 1950s and 1960s shows were organized by MOMA, Art Institute of Chicago, and Baltimore Museum of Art. The Modern withdrew from the Biennale in 1964, and the United States Information Agency ran the Pavilion until it was sold to the Guggenheim Foundation courtesy of funds provided by the Peggy Guggenheim Collection.

Financial support by Philip Morris and private money raised by the Committee for the 1986 American Pavilion at the 1986 Venice Biennale made the exhibition at the United States pavilion possible. Since 1986 the Peggy Guggenheim Collection has worked with the United States Information Agency, the US Department of State and the Fund for Artists at International Festivals and Exhibitions in the organization of the visual arts exhibitions at the US Pavilion, while the Solomon R. Guggenheim Foundation has organized the comparable shows at the Architecture Biennales. Every two years museum curators from across the U.S. detail their visions for the American pavilion in proposals that are reviewed by the NEA Federal Advisory Committee on International Exhibitions (FACIE), a group comprising curators, museum directors and artists who then submit their recommendations to the public-private Fund for United States Artists at International Festivals and Exhibitions. Traditionally the endowment's selection committee has chosen a proposal submitted by a museum or curator, but in 2004 it simply chose an artist who in turn has nominated a curator, later approved by the State Department.

Exhibitions 

Rauschenberg's selection for the 1964 Golden Lion marked the United States' ascendancy over European artistic dominance, and the entrance of pop art into canon.

Representation by year

Art

Architecture

References

Bibliography

Further reading

External links 

 

National pavilions
American contemporary art